Michael W. Cole (born 1971/1972) was a Republican member of the New York State Assembly representing the 142nd Assembly District, covering portions of Erie and Niagara Counties, from 2006 to 2008. He served on the Assembly Committees for Tourism, Arts and Sports Development, Higher Education, Local Governments, and Government Operations. He was also the ranking member of the Ethics and Guidance Committee.  He is an attorney in Alden, New York, where he lives with his family.

Early life

Cole was raised in Alden, New York; and has lived his entire life in Erie County, New York.

Education and early career

Cole is a graduate of Alden Central High School. He received a Bachelor of Science degree from the State University of New York College at Brockport in 1994, and a Juris Doctor degree from the University at Buffalo Law School. He was admitted to the bar in February 2001.

Political career

For former Congress Member Jack Quinn, Cole served as General Counsel and Senior Field Representative.  He worked with Quinn's constituents in Western New York State each day, as well as businesses and non-profits.  Cole's focus was on issues such as crime, seniors, education, youth and families, community development, and agriculture.  Cole was also Quinn’s liaison for issues that affected Western New York veterans.

Additionally, Cole was a New York State Senate legislative assistant for the late Senator John B. Daly.

Cole's first elected office was as Alden Town Councilman in 1998, and he later served as the Town Supervisor.

As New York State Assembly Member

Elections

Cole was first elected to the Assembly during a special election in May 2006, gaining close to 70 percent of the vote. He was elected to his first full term as an Assemblyman on November 7, 2006, defeating Democratic challenger Laura Monte with nearly 57 percent of the vote.

Cole won a Republican nominating convention for his Assembly District in May 2008, but was defeated in the September 2008 Republican primary election by challenger Jane Corwin.

Electoral history
 May 2006 Special Election, NYS Assembly, 142nd AD
{| class="Wikitable"
| Michael W. Cole (REP - IND - CON - STR) || ... || 5,915
|-
| Jeffery A. Bono, III (DEM - WOR) || ... || 2,650
|}

 November 2006 General Election, NYS Assembly, 142nd AD
{| class="Wikitable"
| Michael W. Cole (REP - IND - CON - STR) || ... || 25,035
|-
| Laura Monte (DEM - WOR) || ... || 19,917
|}

 September 2008 Republican Primary Election, NYS Assembly, 142nd AD
{| class="Wikitable"
| Jane L. Corwin || ... || 3,951
|-
| Michael W. Cole  || ... || 3,063
|-
| Leonard A. Roberto   || ... || 1,481
|-
| Jeffrey A. Bono, III || ... || 255
|}

Assembly censure
In 2007, Cole was formally censured by New York State Assembly Speaker Sheldon Silver.  He admitted to drinking excessively with a student intern at a hockey party in Albany that was hosted by former Assemblyman Sam Hoyt, walked her home, and then spent the night in the woman's apartment with her.  These actions were direct violations of the Assembly policy against fraternization with student interns.  The intern additionally lost her position.

Additionally, Cole was removed as the ranking Republican on the Alcoholism and Drug Abuse Committee, was barred from the Assembly Intern Program, and lost the rights and privileges otherwise due to him per his seniority.

Post-political career
Cole maintains a private law practice in Alden.

Personal life
Cole resides in Alden with his wife Lori (née Kolodziej). They have two daughters Emily and Allison; and attend St. John’s Roman Catholic Church in Alden.  Cole is the son of Wayne and Dorothy Cole, and has two brothers, Daniel and Dennis.

See also
 List of New York State Legislature members expelled or censured

References

1970s births
Living people
Republican Party members of the New York State Assembly
State University of New York at Brockport alumni
University at Buffalo Law School alumni